Glenn Anthony May is a professor emeritus of history at the University of Oregon, where he has worked since 1983.  His area of study is Southeast Asian history, U.S. foreign relations, and recently, Chicano history.

Biography
May main focus has been on the Philippines. May earned a PhD from Yale University, where he also studied as an undergraduate student.

May has authored a number of works on the Philippines, including:

 Inventing a Hero: The Posthumous Re-Creation of Andres Bonifacio (University of Wisconsin, Center for Southeast Asian Studies, 1996) Battle for Batangas: A Philippine Province at War (Yale University Press, 1991)
 A Past Recovered: Essays on Philippine History and Historiography (New Day, 1987)
 Social Engineering in the Philippines: The Aims, Execution, and Impact of American Colonial Policy, 1900-1913 (Greenwood Press, 1980)

May came under some harsh criticism for his work on historiography and Andres Bonifacio, a national hero of the Philippines. The book Inventing a Hero: The Posthumous Re-Creation of Andres Bonifacio'' has been criticised.

References

External links 
Here’s a way to immortalize the fools of Wall Street, Glenn Anthony May.

Year of birth missing (living people)
Living people
20th-century American historians
American male non-fiction writers
21st-century American historians
21st-century American male writers
American expatriates in the Philippines
University of Oregon faculty
Yale University alumni
20th-century American male writers